"Venceremos" is a Chilean song written by Claudio Iturra (an alternative version of text was written by Víctor Jara) and composed by Sergio Ortega for the 1970 election campaign of Salvador Allende. The title translates to "We shall prevail".

'Venceremos' is an example of the Nueva canción movement of Chilean protest music, which had been gaining momentum for much of the previous decade. This song marks a significant recognition of the political thrust of this movement in its use as a tool of propaganda for the Unidad Popular coalition. Following the success of 'Venceremos', Allende famously stated "there can be no revolution without song".

References

External links
Lyrics and song of the original version

Lyrics with alternative versions

1970 songs
Chilean songs
Nueva canción
Presidency of Salvador Allende
Protest songs
Spanish-language songs
Víctor Jara songs
Communist songs